Axel Petersen may refer to:

 Axel Petersen (athlete) (1880–1962), Danish athlete
 Axel Petersen (footballer) (1887–1968), Danish amateur footballer